The Gettysburg National Military Park protects and interprets the landscape of the 1863 Battle of Gettysburg during the American Civil War. Located in Gettysburg, Pennsylvania, the park is managed by the National Park Service.  The GNMP properties include most of the Gettysburg Battlefield, many of the battle's support areas during the battle (e.g., reserve, supply, and hospital locations), and several other non-battle areas associated with the battle's "aftermath and commemoration," including the Gettysburg National Cemetery. Many of the park's 43,000 American Civil War artifacts are displayed in the Gettysburg Museum and Visitor Center.

The park has more wooded land than in 1863, and the National Park Service has an ongoing program to restore portions of the battlefield to their historical non-wooded conditions, as well as to replant historic orchards and woodlots that are now missing. In addition, the NPS is restoring native plants to meadows and edges of roads, to encourage habitat as well as provide for historic landscape. There are also considerably more roads and facilities for the benefit of tourists visiting the battlefield park.

Attendance in 2018 was 950,000, a decline of 86% since 1970. The five major Civil War battlefield parks operated by the National Park Service (Gettysburg, Antietam, Shiloh, Chickamauga/Chattanooga and Vicksburg) had a combined 3.1 million visitors in 2018, down 70% from 10.2 million in 1970.<ref>Cameron McWhirter, "Civil War Battlefields Lose Ground as Tourist Draws" Civil War Battlefields Lose Ground as Tourist Draws  "The Wall Street Journal May 25, 2019</ref>

The park was added to the National Register of Historic Places on October 15, 1966.

Federal land acquisition

The 1864 Gettysburg Battlefield Memorial Association and later veteran's associations acquired land for memorials and preservation (e.g., the 72nd Pennsylvania Infantry Monument tract with the statuary memorial depicted on the 2011 America the Beautiful Quarter dollar). In addition to land purchases, federal eminent domain takings include the Gettysburg Electric Railway right-of-ways in 1917 (cf. 1896 United States v. Gettysburg Electric Ry. Co.). The Gettysburg Foundation is a 501(c)(3) non-profit philanthropic, educational organization that operates in partnership with the National Park Service to preserve Gettysburg National Military Park and the Eisenhower National Historic Site, and to educate the public about their significance. (e.g., the Foundation raised funds for and built the new Museum and Visitor Center, opened in 2008, and secured funds for the creation of a new cannon shop that daily preserves the nearly 400 cannons representing actual artillery lines on the battlefield. In addition, the Gettysburg Foundation has provided approximately $20 million in direct support of the National Park Service just since 2009. The Visitor Center houses the Gettysburg Museum of the American Civil War and the 19th century, painting in the round, the Gettysburg Cyclorama)

The park officially came under federal control on February 11, 1895, with a piece of legislation titled, “An Act To establish a national military park at Gettysburg, Pennsylvania.” This piece of legislation officially allowed the transfer of the deed for the park to go from the Gettysburg Battlefield Memorial National Park Association, to the Secretary of War.

In February 2009, The David Wills House where Lincoln completed his Gettysburg Address was added to the national park and is operated by Gettysburg Foundation. In 2010, an effort to expand the amount of the federally-owned GNMP land failed in Congress.

Memorials and remembrance

The Park has been a highly symbolic venue for memorials and remembrance. On November 19, 1963, a parade and ceremony was held in Gettysburg commemorating the centennial of President Lincoln's Gettysburg Address, given less than five months after the Battle of Gettysburg. The actor, Raymond H. Massey, playing the role of President Lincoln, arrived by 1860s period steam train at the Gettysburg station. He rode, in the parade as did Lincoln, on horseback to the National cemetery where actor Massey gave the President's famous address (this time for brevity, Edward Everett's preceding two-hour speech was not read). The parade followed the same route that President Lincoln and Gov. Andrew G. Curtin took 100 years before. Former President Dwight D. Eisenhower—who lived nearby—was there, accompanied by Gov. William W. Scranton. The attendance at the 1963 commemoration was lower than the 20,000 to 30,000 persons who attended the original address by President Lincoln in 1863. Thousands of photographers attended the 1963 event while U.S. Air Force aircraft passed overhead. Also attending the event were the 28th Division of the Pennsylvania National Guard headed by Maj. Gen. Henry F. Fluck, the U.S. Marine Band, and the 3rd Infantry Regiment (The Old Guard) of the U.S. Army. The parade ended at the rear entrance into the Gettysburg National Cemetery. It was not until the installation of a monument to General Lee in 1917 that Confederate memorials were included, which first took the form of individual monuments symbolizing a specific Confederate state.

 Administrative history 
The Gettysburg National Military Park is administered in the North Atlantic–Appalachian region, also known as the Northeast region.

Former and current Superintendents of the Gettysburg National Military Park.
 John P. Nicholson: 1895–1922
 Colonel Emmor B. Cope: 1922–1927
 James B. Aumen: 1927–1927
 Colonel E. E. Davis: 1927–1932
 J. Frank Barber: 1932–1933
 James R. McConaghie: 1933–1941
 J. Walter Coleman: 1941–1958
 James B. Myers: 1958–1963
 Kittridge A. Wing: 1963–1966
 George F. Emery: 1966–1970
 Jerry L. Schober: 1970–1974
 John R. Earnst: 1974–1988
 Daniel Kuehn: 1988 (Sept)-1989 (Sept)
 Jose Cisneros: 1990 (Feb)-1994
 John Latschar: 1994 (Aug)–2009
 Brion Fitzgerald: 2009–2010
 Robert Kirby: 2010–2014
 Ed Clark: 2014–2017
 Charles E. "Chuck" Hunt: 2017–2018
 Chris Stein: 2018–2018
 Lewis H. Rogers Jr: 2018–018
 Ed Wenschhof Jr: 2018–2019
 Kristina Heister: 2019–2019
 Steven D. Sims: 2019–Present

 Ecological challenges 
As the Gettysburg National Military Park increases in popularity it has run into ecological changes caused by this popularity and also natural causes.

There are an estimated annual 2 million people visiting the park a year, and with this large influx of visitors concerns have arisen on its effects on the environment. Natural areas like wooded areas, thickets and wetlands, have been stressed by pollution caused by traffic, and the issue of invasive species threatening the ecology of the park.

References

External links

 
 "Writings of Abraham Lincoln", broadcast from Gettysburg National Military Park from C-SPAN's American Writers''
 
 

All of the following are filed under Gettysburg, Adams County, Pennsylvania:
 
 
 
 
 
 
 
 
 
 
 
 
 
 
 
 
 
 
 
 
 
 
 
 
 
 
 
 
 
 
 
 
 

 
Gettysburg Battlefield
National Battlefields and Military Parks of the United States
National Park Service areas in Pennsylvania
Parks in Adams County, Pennsylvania
History of Adams County, Pennsylvania
Journey Through Hallowed Ground National Heritage Area
American Civil War military monuments and memorials
American Civil War on the National Register of Historic Places
Conflict sites on the National Register of Historic Places in Pennsylvania
National Register of Historic Places in Adams County, Pennsylvania
Parks on the National Register of Historic Places in Pennsylvania
Protected areas established in 1863
1863 establishments in Pennsylvania
Historic American Buildings Survey in Pennsylvania
Historic American Engineering Record in Pennsylvania